The 1974 Fiji rugby union tour of New Zealand was a series of matches played in May–June 1974 in New Zealand by Fiji national rugby union team.

Results

Notes 

Fiji
tour
Fiji national rugby union team tours
tour
Rugby union tours of New Zealand